P. mystaceus may refer to:
Phidippus mystaceus, a species in the genus Phidippus
Phrynocephalus mystaceus, a species in the genus Phrynocephalus
Platyrinchus mystaceus, a species in the genus Platyrinchus
Proagonistes mystaceus, a species in the genus Proagonistes